Megalocranchia fisheri is a species of glass squid. Its natural range covers at least the waters off Hawaii. It inhabits surface and mid-depth waters of open ocean. Juveniles live near the surface, while adults occupy mesopelagic depths during the day and migrate to near-surface waters at night. M. fisheri possesses two large light organs in the gill cavity. Females additionally have light organs on the ends of their third arm pair. As the animal matures, its fins become spear-like in appearance.

It is possible that this taxon is conspecific with Megalocranchia abyssicola, in which case M. fisheri would become a junior synonym.

See also
Cephalopod size

References

External links
Tree of Life web project: Megalocranchia

Further reading

Squid
Molluscs described in 1909